James Matthew Lowery (born January 15, 1961) is a former professional soccer player from Canada.

Club career
Born in Port Alberni on Vancouver Island, Lowery joined the Coulson-Prescott Football Club. A midfielder, Lowery played for the University of Victoria and after graduation also played club soccer for the Canadian Soccer League team, the Vancouver 86ers.

International career
Lowery was a member of Canada's Olympic team which failed to qualify for the 1988 Summer Olympics, making one appearance in qualifying. He made his debut for Canada in a January 1986 friendly match against Paraguay and earned a total of 20 caps, scoring 1 goal. Lowery was on Canada's playing roster for the 1986 FIFA World Cup and played in the country's first game against France. In 2009, Lowery was inducted into the Canadian Soccer Hall of Fame as a member of the 1986 World Cup team.

His final international game was a June 1991 CONCACAF Gold Cup finals match against Mexico in which he scored his only international goal.

International goals
Scores and results list Canada's goal tally first.

Retirement
Lowery is a transit operator for BC Transit in Victoria.

References

External links
  (archive)
 

1961 births
Living people
People from Port Alberni
Association football midfielders
Soccer people from British Columbia
Canadian soccer players
Canada men's international soccer players
1986 FIFA World Cup players
1991 CONCACAF Gold Cup players
Vancouver Whitecaps (1986–2010) players
Canadian Soccer League (1987–1992) players